Alès station is a railway station serving the town Alès, Gard department, southern France. It lies on the railway line from Clermont-Ferrand to Nîmes. The station is served by regional trains to Clermont-Ferrand, Mende and Nîmes.

References

External links
 

Railway stations in Gard